Cotes is a surname of English origin. Notable people with the surname are as follows:

 Ambrosio Cotes (c.1550–1603), Spanish composer
 Charles Cecil Cotes (1846–1898), British landowner and politician
 Everard Charles Cotes (1862—1944), British entomologist
 Francis Cotes (1726–1770), British painter
 George Cotes (death of birth unknown–1556), British Catholic bishop
 John Cotes, multiple people
 Leonard Cotes (fl. 1669-1701[1]), British painter
 Merton Russell-Cotes (1835–1921), Mayor of Bournemouth, England
 Roger Cotes (1682–1716), British mathematician, colleague of Isaac Newton
 Samuel Cotes (1734–1818), British painter
 Thomas Cotes (death of birth unknown–1641), British printer 

Surnames of English origin